Lithophaga, the date mussels, are a genus of medium-sized marine bivalve molluscs in the family Mytilidae. Some of the earliest fossil Lithophaga shells have been found in Mesozoic rocks from the Alps and from Vancouver Island.

The shells of species in this genus are long and narrow with parallel sides. The animals bore into stone or coral rock with the help of pallial gland secretions, hence the systematic name Lithophaga, which means "stone-eater". Their club-shaped borings are given the trace fossil name Gastrochaenolites.

Species
Species within the genus Lithophaga include:
 Lithophaga antillarum (d'Orbigny, 1842) - giant date mussel   
 Lithophaga aristata (Dillwyn, 1817) - scissor date mussel   
 Lithophaga attenuata (Deshayes, 1836) - attenuated date mussel   
 Lithophaga balanas Dall
 Lithophaga balanus Dall 
 Lithophaga bisulcata (d'Orbigny, 1842) - mahogany date mussel   
 Lithophaga cardigera  
 Lithophaga cavernosa 
 Lithophaga cinnamomeus 
 Lithophaga dactylus 
 Lithophaga fasciola Dall, Bartsch, & Rehder 
 Lithophaga gracilis Philippi 
 Lithophaga hawaia Dall, Bartsch, & Rehder 
 Lithophaga ilabis (Deshayes) 
 Lithophaga lithophaga (Linne) 
 Lithophaga nigra (d'Orbigny, 1842) - black date mussel   
 Lithophaga plumula (Hanley, 1844) - feather date mussel 
 Lithophaga punctata (Kleemann & Hoeksema, 2002)   
 Lithophaga rogersi S. S. Berry, 1957 - Roger's date mussel 
 Lithophaga truncata (Gray, 1843)
 Lithophaga simplex

References
 
 Stephen D. A. Smith, Densities of the endolithic bivalve Lithophaga lessepsiana (Vaillant, 1865) in Pocillopora damicornis, Solitary Islands Marine Park, northern NSW, Australia; Molluscan Research 31(1): 42–46; ISSN 1323-5818 

 
Bivalve genera
Extant Triassic first appearances
Taxa named by Peter Friedrich Röding